Margaret Sinclair may refer to:

Margaret Sinclair (nun) (1900 - 1925), Scottish Roman Catholic nun 
 The maiden name of Margaret Trudeau
Margaret Sinclair, Countess of Caithness, see William Sinclair, 2nd Earl of Caithness
Margaret Sinclair Ogden on List of Guggenheim Fellowships awarded in 1960